Dysschema jansonis is a moth of the family Erebidae. It was described by Arthur Gardiner Butler in 1870. It is found in Nicaragua.

References

Dysschema
Moths described in 1870